Israeli–Mexican relations are the diplomatic relations between Israel and Mexico. Both nations are members of the Organisation for Economic Co-operation and Development, the United Nations and the World Trade Organization.

History 

During the Partition of Palestine in November 1947, Mexico was one of ten countries to abstain from voting on the partition. Mexico recognized Israel in January 1950 and both nations established diplomatic relations on 1 July 1952. Since then, both nations have opened embassies in each other's countries, respectively, with Mexico opening its embassy in Tel Aviv in 1959.

In 1975, Mexican President Luis Echeverría paid a state visit to Israel. This was in part due to a desire to amend relations after the passing of UN Resolution 3379 pushed by the Non-Aligned Movement, along with Arab countries and the Soviet bloc, which was a declarative nonbinding measure equating Zionism with South Africa's Apartheid and a form of racial discrimination. This process was a manifestation of Cold War bipolar logic. The bloc voting produced a majority in the United Nations that systematically condemned Israel in the following resolutions: 3089, 3210, 3236, 32/40 and others. The resolution took place in light of Third World politics promoted by political figures such as Mexican president Echeverría. He used the World Conference on Women, 1975 as a platform to build his own figure among the Non-Aligned Movement and looking forward to be Secretary-General of the United Nations. This resulted in a touristic boycott of the American Jewish community against Mexico, which made visible internal and external conflicts of Echeverría's politics. UN resolution 46/86 finally revoked resolution 3379 in 1991.

In 2000, Mexican President Ernesto Zedillo also paid a state visit to Israel. During his stay in Israel, President Zedillo met with Israeli President Ezer Weizman and both leaders signed a Free Trade Agreement between both nations, with the aim of expanding productive ties and business ties.

Over the years, Mexico and Israel have increased military cooperation. In 2008, Mexico purchased US$210 million of Israeli military equipment. There are also several cultural and touristic interchanges between both nations. In 2013, Mexican citizens were one of the biggest visitors to Israel for tourism and religious purposes. In October 2013, the Mexican Congress installed a section in their building dedicated to 'Mexico-Israel Friendship'.

In September 2016, Mexican President Enrique Peña Nieto attended the funeral of former Israeli President, Shimon Peres, held at the National Cemetery Mount Herzl, in Jerusalem. President Peña Nieto was accompanied by the then Foreign Minister, Claudia Ruiz Massieu, as well as members of the Jewish Community in Mexico.

On 13 September 2017, Israeli Prime Minister Benjamin Netanyahu paid an official three day visit to Mexico and met with President Enrique Peña Nieto and members of the Jewish-Mexican community. Prime Minister Netanyahu became the first Israeli head of government to visit Mexico and Latin America. Relations between both nations had been slightly tense since Prime Minister Netanyahu tweeted in January 2017 that he backed U.S. President Donald Trump’s plan to build a border wall between Mexico and the United States. A few days before Prime Minister Netanyahu's visit, IsraAid sent humanitarian supplies to the earthquake stricken region of the Mexican states of Chiapas and Oaxaca after an 8.1 earthquake hit the area on 7 September 2017. During Prime Minister Netanyahu's visit, both nations signed agreements on aviation, in the hopes of establishing direct flights between both nations; international development, specifically cooperation in international development that will focus on relevant development issues including water, agriculture, initiatives and innovation; and a space agreement to create the legal infrastructure for cooperation in the uses of outer space for peaceful purposes.

In July 2022, both nations celebrated 70 years of diplomatic relations.

High-level visits

High-level visits from Israel to Mexico

 Foreign Minister Yigal Allon (1976)
 Foreign Minister Moshe Arens (1990)
 Foreign Minister Shimon Peres (1994)
 President Moshe Katsav (2002)
 President Shimon Peres (2013)
 Prime Minister Benjamin Netanyahu (2017)

High-level visits from Mexico to Israel

 President Luis Echeverría (1975)
 Foreign Minister Emilio Óscar Rabasa Mishkin (1975)
 President Ernesto Zedillo (2000)
 Foreign Minister Rosario Green (2000)
 Foreign Undersecretary Lourdes Aranda (2009)
 President Enrique Peña Nieto (2016)
 Foreign Minister Claudia Ruiz Massieu (2016)

Bilateral agreements
Both nations have signed several bilateral agreements, such as an Agreement on Cultural Cooperation (1960); Agreement for Technical Cooperation (1968); Agreement on Customs Cooperation (1996); Agreement on Cooperation in the Fight against Illicit Trafficking and Abuse of Narcotic Drugs and Psychotropic Substances and Other Serious Crimes (1997); Agreement on Mutual Assistance in Customs Matters (1998); Agreement to Avoid Double Taxation and Prevent Tax Evasion in Income and Property Taxes (2000); Agreement of Collaboration between ProMéxico and the Israeli Institute for Export and International Cooperation (2013); Agreement of Cooperation in the Field of Water Technologies and Water Resources Management (2013); Agreement of Assistance and Technical Cooperation for the Formulation of Strategies of Protection of the Quality of the Groundwater and Actions of Remediation of Aquifers, Protection and Restoration of the Quality of the Water Resources between the Mexican National Commission of the Water (Conagua) and the Israeli Company of Water (Mekorot) (2013); Memorandum of Understanding for Cooperation in Export Credits between the National Foreign Trade Bank, National Credit Society (Bancomext) and Ashr’a, Israel Foreign Trade Risk Insurance Corporation (2013); Agreement on Bilateral Cooperation in Research and Development in the Private Industrial Sector between the National Council of Science and Technology (CONACyT) and the Israeli Industrial Center for Research and Development (2014); and an Agreements on international cooperation for development, air services, and exploration and use of outer space for peaceful purposes (2017).

Trade
On 6 March 2000, both nations signed a free trade agreement. In 2018, two-way trade between both nations amounted to US$955 million. Israel's main exports to Mexico include: chemical based products, electronics and medicine. Mexico's main exports to Israel include: crude oil, vehicles, refrigeration containers, and fruits. Israel is the 18th largest investor in Mexico globally. The accumulated foreign direct investment (FDI) of Israel in Mexico, during the period 1999–2016, reached US$2 billion. Mexican multinational companies such as Altos Hornos de México and Cemex operate in Israel.

Resident diplomatic missions
 Israel has an embassy in Mexico City.
 Mexico has an embassy in Tel Aviv.

See also 
 International recognition of Israel
 Judaism in Mexico

References 

 

 
Mexico
Bilateral relations of Mexico
Jewish Mexican history